Ferdinand de la Serna (21 May 1894 – 17 April 1973) was a Belgian equestrian. He competed in the individual jumping event at the 1920 Summer Olympics.

References

1894 births
1973 deaths
Belgian male equestrians
Olympic equestrians of Belgium
Equestrians at the 1920 Summer Olympics